The 1992 WNBL season was the 12th season of competition since its establishment in 1981. A total of 11 teams contested the league.

Regular season

Ladder

Finals

Season Awards

Statistical leaders

References

https://web.archive.org/web/20150120114035/http://www.wnbl.com.au/fileadmin/user_upload/Media_Guide/Media_Guide_201415.pdf
https://web.archive.org/web/20120318214857/http://www.wnbl.com.au/fileadmin/user_upload/Media_Guide/2011_12/Team_Profiles/10041_BASKAUST_MEDIA_GUIDE_2011-12_WNBL_BACK.pdf

1992
1992 in Australian basketball
Aus
basketball